Colonial Country Club may refer to:

Colonial Country Club (Fort Worth) in Texas
Colonial Country Club (Memphis) in Tennessee
Colonial Golf and Country Club in the New Orleans suburb of Harahan, Louisiana

See also
Colonial Club, a collegiate social club at Princeton University